The Institute of Textile Technology, Choudwar, Cuttack is the only institute in Orissa offering engineering course in Textile Technology. It is a Government run diploma engineering or polytechnic established in 1983 for developing the textile manpower of Orissa for the satisfying the huge demand of manpower in textile industries & for increasing textile technical knowledge of new youth for those growing industries.

History 
Institute of Textile Technology was established in the year of 1983 with offering only the three year diploma engineering in Textile Technology by the department of Industries, Govt. of Orissa. At present it is under Skill Development and Technical Education(SD&TE) department. Firstly it was started for improving the man power ability of the students & peoples of Odisha working in Textile Industries. Then again in 2007 it added Electronics & Telecommunication & Mechanical Engineering to its curriculum. Subsequently, in 2009 Mechatronics is added to its curriculum. Now it is one of the leading & Govt. operated institution of Orissa.

Facilities 

It has facilities like Library, Hostel & Canteen facilities etc.

Courses Offered 

 Textile Technology
 Electrical Engineering
 Mechanical Engineering
 Mechatronics
 Civil Engineering
 Electronics & Telecommunication

Admission Procedure 

Students can get admission to ITT through Diploma Entrance Test(DET) conducted by SCTE & VT every year. Students can get admission in two categories as freshers which is after matriculation & lateral entry after ITI or +2 science. Students have to go through e-counselling process done by DET authority.

Training & Placement 

In ITT, Choudwar there is also a training centre of Department of Industries as in every government polytechnics in Odisha & placement is currently done through Central Placement Cell, Orissa.

References 

Textile schools in India
Technical universities and colleges in Odisha
Cuttack district
Educational institutions established in 1983
1983 establishments in Orissa